Xiddigaha Geeska (The Horn Stars) is a Somali music band from Somaliland. The band is funded by Somaliland's Ministry of Information and National Guidance. The band is led by Hasan Dhuhul Labsalah.

History 
Xiddigaha Geeska was formed in Hargeisa, Somaliland in 2004. The band first rose to fame for promoting the Horn Cable Television group, a Somali television channel based in Somaliland. The band was formed at a time when the broader Somali entertainment and music industry was still struggling due to war, radicalization and cultural stereotyping, and the band soon grew to become a household name in Somaliland as well as other Somali-inhabited territories.

Members

Controversies
A major controversy arose when four members of the group arrived in Mogadishu, Somalia to perform and shared photos online with a blue Somali flag, causing their arrest by Somaliland police for allegedly violating Somaliland's sovereignty.

Tours and Concerts
The Horn Stars have performed in several concert tours outside of Somaliland, including Djibouti, Ethiopia, Kenya, Uganda, and the United Kingdom. The band's debut solo concert tour of 2015 visited Mogadishu.

Discography 

 Guushi way timiday
 Gooni isu taag
 Hashii dhacantay
 Gayigeena oo xor ah
 Soomaali duntoo
 Hankii qaranka rumoobay
 Indhaha dunidaan arkayn
 Dhagaha ugurida
 Himilada dalkeena
 Berbera
 Hankaagu ha dhaafo reer hebel
 Xornimo sumadlaa
 Raali noqo dhulkaygow
 Dhulkaagaa lagu hoddmaa
 Bulshooy soo bixi cashuurta

See also

 Waayaha Cusub

References

Somalian musical groups